Kathryne Maundu is a Kenyan lawyer, corporate executive, counselor and mentor, who serves as the Corporation Secretary of Safaricom, Kenya's largest mobile network operator.

She also concurrently serves as a Senior Manager at the Nairobi office of Deloitte, the multinational professional services conglomerate.

Background and education
Ms Maundu was born in Kenya, circa 1979. She obtained her High School Diploma from Alliance Girls High School, in the town of Kikuyu, in Kiambu County, in 1996.

She was admitted to the law school of Nairobi University, where she earned a Bachelor of Laws degree in 2002. She went on to attend the Kenya School of Law, where she successfully underwent the Advocates Training Programme. As of December 2018, she is enrolled in the Master of Laws degree course at the University of London, with a graduation date in 2022.

Joyce Maundu is registered by the Institute of Certified Public Secretaries of Kenya, as a Certified Public Secretary and as an Accredited Governance Auditor.

Career
After graduating with her law degree, for a period of almost two years, Ms. Maundu worked as an associate lawyer at two Nairobi-based law firms.

In 2010, she joined Deloitte and was posted to the Tanzania office in Dar es Salaam, where she worked as a Senior Consultant for over two years. She was then transferred to the Uganda office, based in Kampala, working there as Principal Consultant for two years, until 2014. She was then moved to the Kenya office, rising to Senior Manager in 2015. As of December 2018, she maintained that position at Deloitte Kenya Limited. In 2016 she was appointed as Corporation Secretary at Safaricom Plc., a position she still occupies as at December 2018.

Other considerations
Ms. Maundu mentors young girls at Safaricom's Mpesa Foundation Academy. She is single. In September 2018, Business Daily Africa, an English language daily newspaper, named Kathryne Maundu among the "Top 40 Under 40 Women in Kenya 2018".

See also
 Rose Ogega
 Theresia Kyalo
 Linda Watiri Muriuki

References

External links
Safaricom announces change of name As of 28 February 2018.

Living people
1979 births
21st-century Kenyan lawyers
Kenyan women lawyers
21st-century Kenyan businesswomen
21st-century Kenyan businesspeople
University of Nairobi alumni
Kenya School of Law alumni
Alumni of the University of London